Save the Drowning Man is a 1967 Soviet comedy film directed by Pavel Arsenov.

Plot 
The film tells about the pioneer Andrew and his friend. They imitate the accident in front of foreign tourists on the water. The young correspondent Egor noticed this, and as a result, the portraits of the pioneer hang wherever possible, he receives an invitation to the radio, people shot a movie about him. And now, when friends wanted to retreat, they began to realize that it would not be as easy as it seems...

Cast 
 Andrei Ushakov as Andrei Vasilkov
 Leonid Karasyov as Gulka (as Lyonya Karasyov)
 Egor Dyakov as Podushkin
 Vladimir Bobylyov
 Vladimir Varenov
 Anna Ratnikova
 Yuri Solodov
 Svetlana Kharitonova
 Valeriy Nosik

References

External links 
 

1967 films
1960s Russian-language films
Soviet comedy films
1967 comedy films